Tatyana Georgievna Ivanova (born January 4, 1940 in Moscow) was a Soviet-Russian Politician (Communist). She graduated from Moscow State University and was Vice-Chairperson of the Presidium of the Supreme Soviet from 1985 to 1990.

References

1940 births
Living people
20th-century Russian women politicians
20th-century Russian politicians
Russian communists
Soviet women in politics
Politicians from Moscow
Moscow State University alumni